Mount Block is a nunatak in the Grosvenor Mountains, standing 5 nautical miles (9 km) south of Block Peak. Discovered by R. Admiral Byrd on the Byrd Antarctic Expedition flight to the South Pole in November 1929, and named by him for Paul Block Jr., son of Paul Block, a patron of the expedition.

Mountains of the Ross Dependency
Dufek Coast